François Deslaugiers (3 December 1934 at Algiers – 18 December 2009 at Marseille) was a French architect.

Education 
After leaving school, Deslaugiers undertook khâgne (second year studies) at the Paris schools Lycée Janson-de-Sailly and then Lycée Henri-IV. In 1952, he entered the École nationale supérieure des beaux-arts, studying under Guy Lagneau, then from 1964 under Louis Arretche. He graduated in 1966.

Career 
After graduating, Deslaughiers worked with his erstwhile teacher, Louis Arretche.

He was president of the Association of Tours Labourdettes in the Canton of Marseille-Belsunce, where he lived.

Works 

 1981: Nemours tax centre
 1984–1989: Façades, lifts and pit of the Arche de la Défense (concept and execution on behalf of Johann Otto von Spreckelsen and Paul Andreu)
 1991: Upper and lower stations of the Montmartre funicular
 1994: Storage rooms of the Musée des arts et métiers, Saint-Denis
 1994: New auditorium at Orléans
 1994: Le Corbusier Viaduct at Lille
 1994: Red entryway at Rennes
 1996: Nanterre Palace of Justice
 1998: Planning of the Museum of Asiatic Arts at Nice (in a building by Kenzo Tange)
 2000: Planning  of the chapel of the Musée des arts et métiers (rgenerated by Andrea Bruno)
 2000: Entry route of Montmajour Abbey, near Arles (renovation by Rudy Ricciotti)
 2002: Bridge at the Gare de Lille-Flandres

References

External links 
 François Deslaugiers on archiguide.fr.fr

20th-century French architects
21st-century French architects
1934 births
2009 deaths
Deaths from cancer in France
People from Algiers
Lycée Henri-IV alumni
École des Beaux-Arts alumni